The Provisional Government of the Second Spanish Republic was the government that held political power in Spain from the fall of Alfonso XIII of Spain on April 14, 1931 and the proclamation of the Second Spanish Republic until the approval of the Spanish Constitution of 1931 on December 9 and the formation of the first regular government on December 15. The King's departure created the need for a provisional government, whose first president was Niceto Alcalá Zamora, who presided until 1936, when Manuel Azaña took over. The new constitution established freedom of speech, freedom of association, extended voting privileges to women, allowed divorce, and stripped the Spanish nobility of their special legal status.

Cabinet of Alcalá Zamora

Cabinet of Azaña 
In October 1931, the prime minister Niceto Alcalá-Zamora and the minister of the Governance, Miguel Maura, left the government. Alcalá-Zamora was replaced by the minister of War and Maura was replaced by the minister of the Navy, Santiago Casares Quiroga. To replace Casares as minister of the Navy, Azaña appointed José Giral Pereira.

References 

Second Spanish Republic
Provisional governments